Paralaubuca harmandi is a species of freshwater ray-finned fish from the family Cyprinidae, the carps and minnows from south east Asia. It occurs in the Mekong and Chao Praya in Thailand, Laos, Cambodia and Vietnam. It is a solitary species which is normally found as scattered individuals in the shallow and medium depths of large rivers. It feeds on zooplankton and insects of larger size than the other species in Paralaubuca. It moves into floodplains during the monsoon to feed and maybe to breed, and it has also been recorded undertaking short migrations upstream in rivers. It is fished for by both commercial and subsistence fisheries and it is processed into fermented products in Cambodia while elsewhere it is salted and dried. This species is rare in the aquarium trade.

References

http://www.fishbase.org/summary/27040

Fish of Thailand
Cyprinid fish of Asia
Paralaubuca
Fish described in 1883